David Kenny (born 1987) is an Irish hurler who plays for Offaly Senior Championship club Belmont. He is a former player and selector at inter-county level with the Offaly senior hurling team.

Career

Kenny made his first appearance for the team during the 2007 championship and has become a regular player over the last few seasons. During that time he has enjoyed little success, however, he has won a National League (Division 2) winners' medal and a Walsh Shield winners' medal.

At club level Kenny plays with Belmont.

Kenny played for NUI Galway in the Fitzgibbon Cup, and was part of the side that lost the 2007 final.

References

External links
David Kenny profile at the Offaly GAA website

1987 births
Living people
University of Galway hurlers
Belmont hurlers
Offaly inter-county hurlers
Leinster inter-provincial hurlers
Hurling selectors